SER is a Nicaraguan magazine of fashion and lifestyle. Its publication is monthly and it is directed mainly to women. It is published by MADERA & Co., conformed by three sisters: Margina, Denise and Raquel Lopez.

History and profile
Its first issue was published in September 2002. Back then, this name was an acronym for Senses, Essences and Realities, alluding to the issues that were illustrated in the magazine. Then it was shortened with the letters to simply name SER (to BE, English translation).

SER is known to reflect images of fashion, high society events and interviews with leading personalities in Nicaragua and internationally, as the Nicaraguan Bianca Jagger, singer Hernaldo Zúñiga, the Puerto Rican Olga Tañon, among others. It is characterized by the use of Nicaraguan women on the cover. Only once, in 2004, did a man appear. It was Peter Nolet, a supermodel from New Zealand who conducted several advertising campaigns for renowned brands such as Giorgio Armani, Salvatore Ferragamo, Hugo Boss, Burberry and Ralph Lauren.

External links
 SER Online

2002 establishments in Nicaragua
Lifestyle magazines
Magazines established in 2002
Magazines published in Nicaragua
Monthly magazines
Spanish-language magazines
Women's fashion magazines